Feel Good Ghosts is an album by Cloud Cult released on Tuesday, April 8, 2008.

Track listing
All songs written by Craig Minowa.
"No One Said It Would Be Easy" – 3:33
"Everybody Here Is a Cloud" – 3:16
"The Tornado Lessons" – 2:34
"When Water Comes to Life" – 3:47
"Must Explore" – 0:21
"Journey of the Featherless" – 3:06
"The Ghost Inside Our House" – 2:52
"It's What You Need" – 1:06
"Story of the Grandson of Jesus" – 2:36
"Hurricane and Fire Survival Guide" – 3:49
"May Your Hearts Stay Strong" – 4:20
"The Will of a Volcano" – 2:37
"Love You All" – 5:03

References

External links
Feel Good Ghosts (Tea-Partying Through Tornadoes) page at CloudCult.com

2008 albums
Cloud Cult albums